Robina Stadium, also known by its sponsored name Cbus Super Stadium, is a rectangular football stadium in the Gold Coast suburb of Robina, Queensland. The main usage is as the home ground to the National Rugby League's Gold Coast Titans; this venue sometimes hosts the A-League team Brisbane Roar FC.

Robina Stadium is also used for Rugby Union, Soccer, Rugby Sevens, Rugby league Test Matches and has hosted Rugby league World Cup matches.

Construction of the venue started in 2006, and finished in February 2008, in time for the 2008 National Rugby League season, when it became the new home of the Titans.

The venue will be used for the 2032 Summer Olympics and will host preliminary Football.

Stadium
Robina Stadium is located in the satellite growth suburb of Robina, next to Robina railway station. The stadium is effectively a smaller version of Suncorp Stadium in Brisbane, and was designed by the same company. The project was funded by the Queensland Government. On 27 September 2006, it was announced that the new ground would be renamed Skilled Park after Skilled Group won the naming rights to the stadium. The land for the site was purchased by the Gold Coast City Council and gifted to the Queensland Government to build the Stadium.

Sports Minister Judy Spence announced that the new stadium will now be able to seat 27,400 people instead of 25,000. This came after workers on the site found extra space for about 2,400 seats across the stadium while construction was in progress.

Robina Stadium hosted two matches in the 2008 Rugby League World Cup, which was held in Australia. The first saw eventual tournament champions New Zealand defeat Papua New Guinea 48–6. The second, a semi-final qualifier, saw a Jarryd Hayne-led Fiji defeat Ireland 30–14. The ground also became host to the newly created A-League side, Gold Coast United, starting in 2009–10.

The ground first saw finals football when the Titans, in their first finals appearance, hosted the Brisbane Broncos in the first week of the 2009 NRL season play-offs. This ground also witnessed finals when the Gold Coast Titans defeated the New Zealand Warriors 28–16 in the 2010 finals.

Beginning in November 2011, the stadium hosted the Gold Coast Sevens, the first event in the annual IRB Sevens World Series of rugby sevens. The country's leg of the series had previously been staged in Adelaide in early autumn (March/April) at the Adelaide Oval, but was put up for bidding upon the expiry of Adelaide's hosting contract.

In Round 4 of the 2014 NRL season, a 3-foot brown snake invaded the stadium, now known as Cbus Super Stadium, during a match between the Titans and Queensland rivals the North Queensland Cowboys. No one was injured, with the snake remaining in the southeast corner until midway through the game.

In 2015, the venue hosted the United Arab Emirates Football team as they prepared for the Asian Cup and it also hosted three Brisbane Roar Asian Champions League fixtures in February, March and May.

The Stadium hosted Game 3 of the 2021 State of Origin series, originally scheduled to be played at Stadium Australia in Sydney. But due to a COVID-19 outbreak in Sydney at the time, The Game was moved to McDonald Jones Stadium in Newcastle before being moved a second time to Robina Stadium.

American rock band Kiss performed at the stadium during their End of the Road World Tour on September 10, 2022, this was the last show of the tour in Australia.

NRL records
 Highest Team Score:
 56 – Manly-Warringah Sea Eagles vs Gold Coast Titans, 20 June 2021
 54 – Brisbane Broncos vs Gold Coast Titans, 5 August 2017
 48 – Melbourne Storm vs Newcastle Knights, 17 July 2021
 46 – Parramatta Eels vs Gold Coast Titans, 22 March 2020
 44 – Cronulla-Sutherland Sharks vs Canterbury-Bankstown Bulldogs, 25 July, 2021
 44 – Gold Coast Titans vs New Zealand Warriors, 5 September 2021

 Largest Winning Margin:
 54 pts – Brisbane Broncos (54) def. Gold Coast Titans (0), 5 August 2017
 44 pts – Melbourne Storm (48) def. Newcastle Knights (4), 17 July 2021
 44 pts – Gold Coast Titans (44) def. New Zealand Warriors (0), 5 September 2021
 40 pts – Parramatta Eels (46) def. Gold Coast Titans (6), 22 March 2020
 38 pts – Melbourne Storm (38) def. Gold Coast Titans (0), 1 May 2016

 Lowest Team Score:
 0 pts – New Zealand Warriors vs Gold Coast Titans, 5 September 2021
 0 pts – Gold Coast Titans vs Brisbane Broncos, 5 August 2017
 0 pts – Canberra Raiders vs. Gold Coast Titans, 17 March 2013
 0 pts – Melbourne Storm vs. Gold Coast Titans, 9 June 2008
 0 pts – Gold Coast Titans vs. Melbourne Storm, 1 May 2016
 4 pts – Gold Coast Titans vs. South Sydney Rabbitohs, 27 July 2013

 Most Tries in a Game:
 4 – Reuben Garrick, Manly-Warringah Sea Eagles vs Gold Coast Titans, 20 June 2021
 4 – Dylan Walker,  South Sydney Rabbitohs Vs Gold Coast Titans, 10 May 2014
 4 – Jordan Atkins, Gold Coast Titans vs. North Queensland Cowboys, 14 March 2008
 3 – Ben Hunt, Brisbane Broncos vs Gold Coast Titans, 5 August 2017 
 3 – Ryan Papenhuyzen, Melbourne Storm vs Cronulla-Sutherland Sharks, 3 September 2021

 Most Points in a Game:
 28 (4.6.0) – Reuben Garrick, Manly-Warringah Sea Eagles vs Gold Coast Titans, 20 June 2021
 22 (2.7.0) – Pat Richards, Wests Tigers vs Gold Coast Titans, 16 March 2014
 22 (1.9.0) – Mitchell Moses, Parramatta Eels vs Gold Coast Titans, 22 March 2020
 20 (2.6.0) – Shaun Johnson, New Zealand Warriors vs Gold Coast Titans, 20 June 2015
 20 (2.6.0) – Scott Prince, Gold Coast Titans vs. Wests Tigers, 29 August 2009

 Most Tries Scored:
 36 – David Mead (Gold Coast Titans/Brisbane Broncos)
 35 – Anthony Don (Gold Coast Titans)
 30 – Kevin Gordon (Gold Coast Titans)
 21 – William Zillman (Gold Coast Titans)
 16 – Ryan James (Gold Coast Titans/Canberra Raiders/Canterbury-Bankstown Bulldogs)

 Most Points Scored:
 377 (11.166.1) – Scott Prince (Gold Coast Titans/Brisbane Broncos)
 192 (7.80.4) – Aidan Sezer (Gold Coast Titans/Canberra Raiders)
 158 (10.58.2) – Ashley Taylor (Gold Coast Titans)
 144 (36.0.0) – David Mead (Gold Coast Titans/Brisbane Broncos)
 142 (35.1.0) – Anthony Don (Gold Coast Titans)

Crowd records
The stadium produced a record attendance of 27,176 on 18 April 2008 when it hosted the Heritage Round National Rugby League match between Gold Coast Titans and Brisbane Broncos. This figure was surpassed by a crowd of 27,227 on 12 September in a match against the same team in the 3rd qualifying final of the NRL Finals Series 2009.

Sports events

Rugby league test matches
List of rugby league test and World Cup matches played at Robina Stadium since its opening in 2008.

* Matches played as part of the 2008 World Cup.† 2011 ANZAC Test.‡ Matches played as part of the 2015 Pacific Internationals (double header)

Rugby union test matches

See also

 Sports on the Gold Coast, Queensland
 Carrara Stadium – Used as the primary home venue of the Titans in 2007.

References

External links
 

Rugby league stadiums in Australia
Rugby League World Cup stadiums
A-League Men stadiums
Rugby union stadiums in Australia
Sports venues on the Gold Coast, Queensland
Gold Coast Titans
Gold Coast United FC
2018 Commonwealth Games venues
2008 establishments in Australia
Sports venues completed in 2008
Robina, Queensland
Commonwealth Games rugby union venues
Soccer venues in Queensland
World Rugby Sevens Series venues
Venues of the 2032 Summer Olympics and Paralympics
Rugby sevens at the 2018 Commonwealth Games